Moscow Finance and Economics University (MFEU) is private non-profit research university specialized in the field of finance and economics. It has international connections and mutual exchange programs with universities in the UK, USA and France. One of the few universities in Russia that offers full accredited programs in Mathematics, Economics and Social Sciences entirely in English language. Since 2013 university adopted American system  American Education System

Faculties
As of 2012, the university has 16 faculties. The biggest faculty is a Faculty of Economics which offered bachelor's and master's degrees in 12 various disciplines. Also a number of small liberal art faculties have been opened, these include Sociology, Psychology and IT.

Universities in Moscow